Richard Neil Zare (born November 19, 1939, in Cleveland, Ohio) is the Marguerite Blake Wilbur Professor in Natural Science and a Professor of Chemistry at Stanford University. Throughout his career, Zare has made a considerable impact in physical chemistry and analytical chemistry, particularly  through the development of laser-induced fluorescence (LIF) and the study of chemical reactions at the molecular and nanoscale level. LIF is an extremely sensitive technique with applications ranging from analytical chemistry and molecular biology to astrophysics. One of its applications was the sequencing of the human genome.

Zare is known for his enthusiasm for science and his exploration of new areas of research.  He has mentored over 150 PhD students and postdoctoral researchers, of whom more than 49 are women or members of minorities. Zare is a strong advocate for women in science, and a fellow of the Association for Women in Science (AWIS) as of 2008.

Education
Zare earned his BA in chemistry and physics in 1961 and his PhD in 1964 in physical and analytical chemistry at Harvard University. As an undergraduate he worked with William Klemperer. Zare moved to the University of California, Berkeley to do PhD work with Dudley Herschbach, then returned 2 years later when Herschbach accepted a position at Harvard. Zare completed his PhD thesis, a theoretical analysis of Molecular fluorescence and photodissociation, with Herschbach at Harvard in 1964.

Career
Zare joined Massachusetts Institute of Technology as an assistant professor in 1965. From 1966 to 1969, he was jointly appointed in the departments of chemistry, physics and astrophysics at JILA at the University of Colorado Boulder.  In 1969 he became a full professor in the Department of Chemistry at Columbia University. He was named the Higgins Professor of Natural Science at Columbia in 1975.

In 1977 Zare accepted a position as a full professor of chemistry at Stanford University, becoming the Marguerite Blake Wilbur Professor in Natural Science in 1987.  He served as chair of the chemistry department from 2005 to 2011.

Zare  served on the National Science Board (NSB) of the National Science Foundation (NSF) from 1990 to 1996, and was the board's chair from 1994 to 1996.
He was a founding co-editor of the Annual Review of Analytical Chemistry from 2008–2012.
He is a member of the editorial advisory boards of other scientific publications, among them Chemistry World, Angewandte Chemie, Central European Journal of Chemistry, Journal of Separation Sciences and the Chinese Journal of Chromatography.
 
Zare served on the Physical Sciences jury for the Infosys Prize from 2014 to 2016. 
He is chairman of the board of directors at Annual Reviews, Inc., and serves on the board of directors of The Camille and Henry Dreyfus Foundation.

Research

Zare is well known for his research in laser chemistry, particularly the development of laser-induced fluorescence, which he has used to study reaction dynamics and analytical detection methods.  His research on the spectroscopy of chemical compounds suggested a new mechanism for energy transference in inelastic collisions.
He and his students have developed tools and  techniques to examine chemical reactions at the molecular and nanoscale levels. They have explored a wide-ranging variety of problems in physical chemistry and chemical analysis including examination of heterogeneous structures in mineral samples, the contents of cells and subcellular compartments, and the chemical analysis of liquid samples.

Early in his career, the question of whether laser-induced fluorescence (LIF) could be used to study aflatoxins spurred Zare to adapt LIF for use on liquids.  Work with postdoc Gerald Diebold resulted in the first use of LIF for detection in chemical analysis. 
This opened up the potential for a wide variety of fluid applications, including the detection of single molecules in liquids at room-temperature and detection methods for capillary electrophoresis.
Zare and his coworkers have combined CCD imaging with LIF detection to detect amol and zeptamole amounts of FITC-labelled amino acids.
Zare and his students have also developed cavity ring-down spectroscopy (CRDS) for quantitative diagnosis, and for high performance liquid chromatography (HPLC)  
Zare is also involved in the development of desorption electrospray ionization (DESI) techniques, which are being used for mass spectrometric imaging of lipids, metabolites and proteins in tissue samples, including prostate cancer.

Zare has also worked with NASA and others on astrobiology. He is one of the co-authors of a paper that appeared in Science in 1996, raising the possibility that a meteorite from Mars, ALH84001, contained traces of Martian life. Zare used  two-step laser mass spectrometry (L2MS), a technique that is particularly sensitive to organic molecules, to examine samples from the interior of the meteorite. He found that the  4.5-billion-year-old Martian meteorite, discovered in Antarctica, contained polycyclic aromatic hydrocarbons. This lead researchers to speculate on the presence of fossilized remains from Mars. Other researchers questioned this interpretation, suggesting that the sample might have been contaminated after its arrival on Earth. Considerable controversy resulted, which Zare felt disrupted his ongoing laboratory research. Zare has also worked with NASA on examinations of organic materials obtained from Comet 81P/Wild by the Stardust Spacecraft.

Publications
Zare has published several books, including a widely used textbook on the topic of angular momentum in quantum systems that is considered a classic for its explanations of angular momentum algebra and the fundamentals of molecular spectroscopy.  He is an author or co-author of more than 1,000 peer-reviewed papers.

Selected publications

Books

Awards, honors and fellowships

 1974 – National Fresenius Award, Phi Lambda Upsilon
 1976 – Member, National Academy of Sciences
 1976 – Member, American Academy of Arts and Sciences
 1979 – inaugural recipient of the Michael Polanyi Medal, Royal Society of Chemistry
 1981 – Earle K. Plyler Prize
 1983 – Spectroscopy Society of Pittsburgh Award
 1983 – National Medal of Science
 1985 – Irving Langmuir Award in Chemical Physics
 1986 – Michelson-Morley Award
 1986 – John Gamble Kirkwood Award, ACS New Haven Section, "in recognition of his fundamental contributions in experimental and theoretical aspects of reaction dynamics."
 1990 – Willard Gibbs Medal
 1991 – Peter Debye Award
 1991 – National Academy of Sciences Award in Chemical Sciences, "For his pioneering laser-based techniques, deep insights, and seminal contributions, which have influenced every facet of chemical reaction dynamics."
 1991 – Member, American Philosophical Society
 1993 – Dannie Heineman Prize
 1993 – The Harvey Prize
 1995 – ACS Division of Analytical Chemistry Award in Chemical Instrumentation
 1996 – The Bing Fellowship teaching award
 1997 – California Scientist of the Year Award
 1998 – American Chemical Society Award in Analytical Chemistry
 1999 – E. Bright Wilson Award in Spectroscopy
 1999 – Welch Award in Chemistry
 1999 – Foreign Member of the Royal Society of London
 2000 – honorary doctorate, Faculty of Science and Technology, Uppsala University, Sweden
 2000 – Arthur L. Schawlow Prize in Laser Science
 2000 – Nobel Laureate Signature Award for Graduate Education
 2001 – Charles Lathrop Parsons Award
 2001 – Faraday Lectureship Prize, Royal Society of Chemistry
 2003 – Laurance and Naomi Carpenter Hoagland Prize
 2004 – Foreign member, Royal Swedish Academy of Sciences
 2004 – Foreign member, Chinese Academy of Sciences (CAS), Beijing, P.R.C.
 2004 – James Flack Norris Award for Outstanding Achievement in the Teaching of Chemistry, Northeastern Section of the American Chemical Society
 2005 – Nichols Medal, ACS (New York Section) 
 2005 – Wolf Prize in Chemistry
 2005 – Howard Hughes Medical Institute Professorship
 2009 – F.A. Cotton Medal for Excellence in Chemical Research of the American Chemical Society
 2009 – BBVA Foundation Frontiers of Knowledge Award in Basic Science (co-winner with Michael Fisher)
 2010 – Priestley Medal
 2011 – King Faisal International Prize
2012 – Recipient of the Reed M. Izatt and James J. Christensen Lectureship.
2017 – Othmer Gold Medal from the Chemical Heritage Foundation

References

External links

Richard Zare's film collection at Stanford University's archives

1939 births
Living people
Foreign Members of the Royal Society
Harvard College alumni
Jewish American scientists
Jewish chemists
National Medal of Science laureates
American physical chemists
Stanford University Department of Chemistry faculty
Columbia University faculty
Wolf Prize in Chemistry laureates
Members of the Royal Swedish Academy of Engineering Sciences
Faraday Lecturers
Members of the United States National Academy of Sciences
Foreign members of the Chinese Academy of Sciences
Spectroscopists
Fellows of the American Physical Society
Annual Reviews (publisher) editors
21st-century American Jews
Harvard Graduate School of Arts and Sciences alumni